Come Down to the Merry Go Round is an EP by garage rock band Laughing Hyenas. It was released in 1987 on Touch and Go Records. It was reissued in 1995 accompanied with five bonus tracks.

Track listing

Personnel 
Adapted from the Come Down to the Merry Go Round liner notes.

Laughing Hyenas
 John Brannon – lead vocals, trumpet
 Jim Kimball – drums
 Kevin Strickland – bass guitar
 Larissa Strickland – guitar

Production and additional personnel
 Tim Caldwell – design
 Laughing Hyenas – production
 Rick Lieder – photography
 Butch Vig – production, engineering, recording

Release history

References

External links 
 

1987 debut EPs
Laughing Hyenas albums
Albums produced by Butch Vig
Touch and Go Records EPs